Wadi Khudra  is a narrow wadi and gorge in the Sinai.

References

Canyons and gorges
Sinai Peninsula
Khudra